Kai Fischer (born 18 March 1934) is a German film actress. She appeared in more than 50 films between 1955 and 1999.

Selected filmography

 Operation Sleeping Bag (1955)
 The Bath in the Barn (1956)
 Sand, Love and Salt (1957)
 Für zwei Groschen Zärtlichkeit (Call Girls) (1957)
 The Spessart Inn (1958)
 Heart Without Mercy  (1958)
 I Was All His (1958)
 Girls of the Night (1958)
  (1958)
  (1958)
  (1958)
 Girls for the Mambo-Bar (1959)
 Uncle Was a Vampire (1959)
 Freddy and the Melody of the Night (1960)
 The Hellfire Club (1960)
 Too Hot to Handle (1960)
 The Bashful Elephant (1961)
 Escape from East Berlin (1962)
 Walt Disney's Wonderful World of Color :  (1963)
 Room 13 (1964)
 Bullets Don't Argue (1964)
  (1966, TV miniseries)
 The Strangler of the Tower (1966)
 Man on the Spying Trapeze (Anónima de asesinos) (1966)
 Maneater of Hydra (1967)
  (1968)
  (1968, TV miniseries)
 Salto Mortale (1969-1972, TV series)
 The Goalkeeper's Fear of the Penalty (1972)
 The Serpent's Egg (1977)
  (1977)
 Derrick - Season 5, Episode 10: "Der Spitzel" (1978)
  (1979)
  (1983)

References

External links

1934 births
Living people
German film actresses
German television actresses
Actresses from Prague
20th-century German actresses